Houlton is an unincorporated census-designated place located in St. Croix County, Wisconsin, United States. Houlton is located across the St. Croix River from Stillwater, Minnesota, in the town of St. Joseph. Houlton has no post office but has been assigned the ZIP code 54082. As of the 2010 census, its population was 386.

References

Census-designated places in St. Croix County, Wisconsin
Census-designated places in Wisconsin